was the 1st daimyō of Kuroishi Domain in northern Mutsu Province, Honshū, Japan (modern-day Aomori Prefecture). His courtesy title was Kai-no-kami, and his Court rank was Junior Fifth Rank, Lower Grade.

Biography
Tsugaru Chikatari was the fourth son of Kuroda Naoyuki, daimyō of Kururi Domain in Kazusa Province, (part of present-day Chiba Prefecture) and was born in that domain's Edo residence. In 1805, he was adopted as the posthumous heir of Tsugaru Tsunetoshi (1789–1805), the 7th Lord of Kuroishi, a 4000 koku hatamoto dependency of Hirosaki Domain. However, in April 1809, the Tokugawa shogunate raised the status of Kuroishi to a full han as part of its agreement with Tsugaru Yasuchika over dispatch of troops to guard the Ezo frontier, and Chikatari saw his revenues increase by an additional 6000 koku, and allowing him to join the ranks of the daimyō.

In 1825, he retired, turning administration of the domain to his adopted son, Tsugaru Yukitsugu. He died in 1849 at the clan's residence in Edo. His grave is at the clan temple of Shinryō-in (a subsidiary of Kan'ei-ji) in Taitō-ku, Tokyo.

See also
Tsugaru clan

References
Koyasu Nobushige (1880). Buke kazoku meiyoden 武家家族名誉伝 Volume 1. Tokyo: Koyasu Nobushige. (Accessed from National Diet Library, 17 July 2008)
 Kurotaki, Jūjirō (1984). Tsugaru-han no hanzai to keibatsu 津軽藩の犯罪と刑罰. Hirosaki: Hoppō shinsha.
 Narita, Suegorō (1975). Tsugaru Tamenobu: shidan 津軽為信: 史談. Aomori: Tōō Nippōsha.
 Tsugaru Tsuguakira Kō Den kankōkai (1976). Tsugaru Tsuguakira kō-den 津輕承昭公傳. Tokyo: Rekishi Toshosha
 The content of much of this article was derived from that of the corresponding article on Japanese Wikipedia.

External links
 "Hirosaki-jō" (17 February 2008)
 "Tsugaru-han" on Edo 300 HTML (17 February 2008)

Tozama daimyo
Tsugaru clan
Kuroda clan
1788 births
1849 deaths
People of Edo-period Japan